Charles Alexandre Casimir Poulenard (30 March 1885 – 10 November 1958) was a French sprinter who competed at the 1912 Summer Olympics. He won a silver medal in the 4×400 metre relay and failed to reach the finals of individual 200 m, 400 m and 800 m events.

References

1885 births
1958 deaths
French male sprinters
Olympic silver medalists for France
Athletes (track and field) at the 1912 Summer Olympics
Olympic athletes of France
Medalists at the 1912 Summer Olympics
Olympic silver medalists in athletics (track and field)